Melvin Joffrion Didier Sr. (June 25, 1926 – September 10, 2017) was an American professional baseball pitcher in Minor League Baseball for two years (1948-49). However, he spent more than 60 years in pro ball as a scout and executive.

Biography
Born in Marksville, Louisiana, Didier was raised in Baton Rouge, Louisiana. He attended Louisiana State University (LSU) where he played both football and baseball for the Tigers. His career covered a wide array of involvement in athletics for over 70 years from starting his career as a football and baseball coach at his alma mater, Catholic High School in Baton Rouge, to a football assistants' job at LSU. Didier moved to professional baseball as both a scout and later as a front office executive for three expansion clubs.

Didier pitched in 1948 for the Stroudsburg Poconos and in 1949 for the Thomasville Tigers, ending his career with an 11–15 win–loss record and a 6.33 earned run average (ERA) in his two-year career. A shoulder injury ended his playing days with the Detroit Tigers organization but not his association with the game.

When the expansion Montreal Expos began in 1969, Didier was hired as director of scouting and player development, a position that he held until September 1975. During his time at Montreal, he was responsible for the signings of future Baseball Hall of Famers Gary Carter (1972) and Andre Dawson (1975).

Didier was the running backs/freshman coach at his alma mater, LSU, when the expansion Expos hired him to oversee their player development. He was the director of player development for the Seattle Mariners from 1977 to 1978, after which he joined the Cleveland Indians. He was the baseball coach at the University of Southwestern Louisiana from 1981 to 1982, also serving as its athletic director in 1982.

Didier then became a scout for the Los Angeles Dodgers, whom he convinced to acquire free agent Kirk Gibson in 1988. As a result, he gained fame for his scouting report on Oakland Athletics ace relief pitcher Dennis Eckersley, which Gibson credited for his dramatic 1988 World Series Game One-winning pinch-hit home run against Eckersley; the Dodgers would go on to win the series in five games.

Didier joined the expansion Arizona Diamondbacks in December 1996 and served with them through October 2000. He then served a second stint in Cleveland, followed by a year with the Baltimore Orioles. After that, he worked for the Texas Rangers as a special assignments scout. In October 2009, he joined the Toronto Blue Jays, whom he served until his death.

In 2003, Didier gained induction into the Louisiana Sports Hall of Fame. Then in 2014, Aquila Productions made the documentary, Scout's Honor: The Mel Didier Story," which baseball greats, including Gibson, talk about Didier's influence on the game.

His son Bob was a catcher in the Major Leagues from 1969 through 1974, and later had a long post-playing career as a coach, scout and minor league manager.

Didier died on September 10, 2017, in his home in Phoenix, Arizona, at the age of 91.

References

External links

Mel Didier at SABR (Baseball BioProject)

1926 births
2017 deaths
Arizona Diamondbacks executives
American expatriate baseball people in Canada
Atlanta Braves scouts
Baseball coaches from Louisiana
Baseball players from Louisiana
Catholic High School (Baton Rouge, Louisiana) alumni
Cleveland Indians scouts
Detroit Tigers scouts
Los Angeles Dodgers scouts
Louisiana Ragin' Cajuns athletic directors
Louisiana Ragin' Cajuns baseball coaches
LSU Tigers football coaches
Major League Baseball farm directors
Major League Baseball scouts
Milwaukee Braves scouts
Montreal Expos executives
People from Baton Rouge, Louisiana
People from Dunedin, Florida
People from Marksville, Louisiana
Seattle Mariners executives
Stroudsburg Poconos players
Texas Rangers scouts
Thomasville Tigers players
Toronto Blue Jays scouts
LSU Tigers football players
LSU Tigers baseball players
High school baseball coaches in the United States
High school football coaches in Louisiana